Eyelet is the third studio album by Welsh band Islet. It was released on 6 March 2020 under Fire Records.

Critical reception
Eyelet was met with generally favourable reviews from critics. At Metacritic, which assigns a weighted average rating out of 100 to reviews from mainstream publications, this release received an average score of 74, based on 6 reviews.

Track listing

References

2020 albums
Fire Records (UK) albums
Avant-pop albums